Rafael Luiz Araujo-Lopes (born April 7, 1996) is a Brazilian American professional gridiron football wide receiver. He played for the Ottawa Redblacks of the Canadian Football League (CFL). He played college football at Pittsburgh.

College career
After attending Winter Park High School, Araujo-Lopes played college football for Reedley College in 2014 and for Pittsburgh from 2015 to 2018.

Professional career
In July 2019, Araujo-Lopes signed with the Ottawa Redblacks. He made his professional debut on August 8, 2019 against the Edmonton Eskimos where he recorded six receptions for 57 yards. He played in two regular season games in 2019. He re-signed with the Redblacks on January 12, 2021.

References

External links
 Pittsburgh Panthers football bio

1996 births
Living people
American players of Canadian football
American football wide receivers
Canadian football wide receivers
American people of Brazilian descent
Winter Park High School alumni
Reedley Tigers football players
Pittsburgh Panthers football players
Ottawa Redblacks players
People from Kissimmee, Florida
Players of American football from Florida
Players of Canadian football from Florida
American sportspeople